The Shanghai Masters (also known as Shanghai Rolex Masters for sponsorship reasons) is a professional men's tennis tournament played on outdoor hard courts, and held annually in early October at the Qizhong Forest Sports City Arena in the Minhang District of Shanghai. The tournament is chronologically the eighth out of nine ATP Tour Masters 1000 events on the ATP Tour, and is the only one not played in Europe or North America.

The tournament has not been held since 2019 due to Chinese travel restrictions related to the COVID-19 pandemic.

Organization

Competition format
Matches in the singles and doubles main draws are played over eight days, from one Sunday to the next (in 2013, competition was held from October 6 to October 13, and this year competition will be held from October 11 to October 18). Qualifying matches for the singles main draw will be played in the weekend preceding the first complete week of competition (in 2012, on Saturday, October 5 and Sunday, October 6).

The singles main draw features 56 different players (six rounds of play to the title for all competitors but the top 8 seeds), including 44 or 45 direct acceptances, 7 qualifiers, 4 wild cards, and 1 eventual special exempt. The singles qualifying draw features 28 different players (two rounds of play to qualification for all competitors including the 14 seeds), with 24 direct acceptances, and 4 wild cards. The doubles draw, finally, features 24 different teams (five rounds of play to the title for all competitors but the 8 seeded teams), including 22 direct acceptances (16 in advance, 6 on-site), and 2 wild cards.

The entry deadline for direct acceptance comes twenty-one days prior to the first Monday of the tournament week for the singles main and qualifying draws, and fourteen days prior to the first Monday of the tournament week, with six spots reserved for on-site entries, for the doubles draw. Players and teams on the acceptance list are sorted according to their position in the computerized ATP rankings in the week preceding competition, to enter the main draws, the qualifying draw (in singles) or to be kept as alternates (in doubles).

The singles and doubles draws are set first by selecting the eight seeds in both the singles and doubles competition, according to the most recent ATP rankings in the week preceding competition. After the seeds and byes are placed, the remaining players, including wild cards, qualifiers and special exempts (in singles) are placed in the rest of the draw, from top to bottom.

All singles matches are played in best-of-three tie-break sets format, while the doubles matches are played in two tie-break sets and a match tie-break, and use the no ad scoring system.

Points and prize money
As an ATP Tour Masters 1000 event, the tournament distributes up to 1000 ATP rankings points to the singles and doubles champions. For the 2019 edition, a total of US$8,322,885 will be shared between the singles and doubles competitors. These are tables detailing the points and prize money allocation for each round of the 2019 Shanghai Masters:

Points

Prize money

Venue

All matches are played in outdoor conditions at the Qizhong Arena, after the venue held the Tennis Masters Cup indoors from 2005 to 2008. The surface is hard court, specifically DecoTurf.

The venue was originally built in 2004 and 2005 to host the Tennis Masters Cup, after the ATP awarded the tournament to Shanghai for a three-year contract (2005–2007), later extended to a fourth year. The site was conceived to become the largest tennis venue in Asia, with a 15,000-seats main stadium featuring a retractable roof of eight steel panels representing Shanghai's city flower, the magnolia. As of 2013, the Arena's Grand Stand Court 1 stands in fifth place in the list of tennis stadiums by capacity, alongside Beijing's National Tennis Stadium (built for the 2008 Summer Olympics) and Wimbledon's Centre Court.

In preparation of the first edition of the Shanghai Masters, the venue was expanded with several new stadiums and courts constructed by August 2009, including a Grand Stand Court 2, with a seating capacity of 5,000 spectators, and a Grand Stand Court 3, with a seating capacity of 3,000 spectators.

History
The Shanghai ATP Masters 1000 was established to fulfill the desire of the ATP World Tour and the Chinese Tennis Association to develop the market for tennis in China and Asia in general. In 2010 following a sponsorship deal the tournament was renamed the Shanghai Rolex Masters.

In 1996, a professional tournament was held for the first time in Shanghai, the largest city in China. The inaugural Shanghai Open was won by Russian Andrei Olhovskiy over Mark Knowles of the Bahamas. In 2002 the year-end championships, then called the Tennis Masters Cup. were held in the city. The success of the 2002 Tennis Masters Cup, won by World No. 1 Lleyton Hewitt from Australia, prompted the ATP, which had abandoned the idea of a touring Tennis Masters Cup, to award Shanghai the right to hold the tournament from 2005 to 2007.

While the ATP International Series tournament of Shanghai was held two more years in 2003 and 2004 at the Shanghai New International Expo Center created for the 2002 Tennis Masters Cup, a new facility, the Qizhong Forest Sports City Arena, was built to host the year-end championships starting from 2005. The ATP eventually extended the three-year deal to a fourth year in 2006, allowing the Tennis Masters Cup to increase its success in Shanghai. Over the four years spent at the Qizhong venue, the tournament saw Swiss World No. 1 Roger Federer reach three finals, losing the first in 2005 to Argentine David Nalbandian before winning the following two in 2006 and 2007, and Novak Djokovic of Serbia taking the 2008 title.

In March 2007, the ATP announced that their 2009 rebranding  would also be the occasion to use the Qizhong facility and the Shanghai Tennis Masters Cup organisation to host an ATP World Tour Masters 1000 event in the city, the equivalent of what were then the ATP Masters Series. Shanghai was eventually given the October spot in the calendar, previously held by the Mutua Madrileña Masters Madrid indoor hard courts event, but was to be held as an outdoor hard surface tournament, thereby reducing the number of indoor Masters events to one, that being the Paris Masters. The new Mutua Madrileña Madrid Open moved to outdoor red clay courts during the spring European clay court season. The Tennis Masters Cup became the ATP World Tour Finals and moved to the O2 arena in London, United Kingdom.

Organized by Juss International Sports Event Management Company directed by Jiang Lan, the event was formally presented in a press conference on November 13, 2008, during the season's Tennis Masters Cup tournament, where the choice of the draw sizes, of the surface, and the building of additional courts were announced. Rolex, the Swiss watch company, was also revealed as the official sponsor of the event. The promotional campaign for the tournament started in early 2009, with the presentation of its slogan, "Simply The Best", and the event was officially launched on May 5, 2009. Expecting nearly 150,000 spectators during the tournament, the Shanghai Rolex Masters was introduced as the flagship of an Asian swing in the 2009 ATP World Tour calendar after the late September ATP World Tour 250 Thailand Open of Bangkok and Malaysian Open of Kuala Lumpur, and then early October ATP World Tour 500 Japan Open Tennis Championships of Tokyo and China Open of Beijing.

Past finals
In singles, Novak Djokovic (winner in 2012–13, 2015, and 2018) holds the record for most titles (four). Djokovic and Andy Murray share the records for most consecutive titles (two victories in a row each), and most finals (four). In doubles, Marcelo Melo (winner in 2013, 2015, and 2018) holds the record for most titles (three), and no player has collected back-to-back titles yet.

Singles

Doubles

Records
Source: The Tennis Base

Singles

Longest final

Shortest finals

References

External links

Official website 
 ATP tournament profile

 
Hard court tennis tournaments
Tennis tournaments in China
Sports competitions in Shanghai
Recurring sporting events established in 2009
ATP Tour Masters 1000
2009 establishments in China
Rolex sponsorships